Oryzopsis is a genus of Chinese and North American plants in the grass family.  Species from this genus are commonly called ricegrass.

The name alludes to the resemblance between this genus and true rice, Oryza.

 Species
 Oryzopsis asperifolia  – roughleaf ricegrass  - Canada (all 10 provinces plus Yukon + Northwest Territories), United States (Northeast, Great Lakes, Black Hills, Rocky Mountains)
 Oryzopsis chinensis  - China
 Oryzopsis contracta  - Colorado, Wyoming, Montana
 Oryzopsis exigua  - Wyoming
 Oryzopsis hendersonii  - Oregon, Idaho, Washington state
 Oryzopsis holciformis  (syn. Piptatherum holciforme (M.Bieb.) Roem. & Schult.) - Israel
 Oryzopsis hymenoides  - western North America from British Columbia + Alberta to California + New Mexico
 Oryzopsis pungens  - Canada, northern United States
 Oryzopsis swallenii  - Idaho, Wyoming

 formerly included
numerous species once regarded as members of Oryzopsis but now considered better suited to other genera: Achnatherum Achnella Anemanthele Eriocoma Nassella Piptatherum Piptatheropsis Piptochaetium Ptilagrostis Stipa Stiporyzopsis

References

Pooideae
Grasses of North America
Grasses of Asia
Poaceae genera
Taxa named by André Michaux